Dream Your Life Away is the debut studio album by Australian singer-songwriter Vance Joy. It was released in Australia on 5 September 2014 via Liberation Music. The album was released on 9 September 2014 in the US via Atlantic Records and worldwide via Warner Music. The album has peaked to number 1 on the Australian Albums Chart. A "Deluxe Edition" was released on 4 September 2015, consisting of two new tracks and five live tracks.

As of January 2018, the album has worldwide sales over 2,000,000.

Background 
During a performance in Boston, Vance Joy explained that the song "My Kind of Man" included advice his uncle once gave him when he was young. But he later learned from his father that the quoted advice was actually from a Lynyrd Skynyrd song. Vance Joy noted that though the lyrics changed, the message stayed the same: "Find something you love and understand."

Singles 
 "Mess Is Mine" was released on 9 July 2014 as the album's lead single. The song has peaked to number 33 on the Australian Singles Chart.
 "First Time" was released on 4 August 2014 as the album's second single.
 "Georgia" was released in February 2015 as the album's third single. It has currently peaked at number 11 on the Australian Singles Chart.
 "All I Ever Wanted" was slated as the fourth single but due to the release of "Fire and the Flood" in support of the deluxe edition of "Dream Your Life Away", it was only released to radio. A music video was also released in support of the proposed single release. 
"Fire and the Flood" was released in July 2015 as the first single on the deluxe re-issue of the album, and fourth overall. The song peaked at number 6 on the ARIA charts.
 "Straight into Your Arms" was released in February 2016 as the album's final single.

The album also includes the singles "From Afar" and "Riptide", previously released on Joy's debut EP God Loves You When You're Dancing.

Critical reception 

Timothy Monger from AllMusic noted that the album is "built around the centerpiece of "Riptide" and that it "offers up a dozen or so additional songs in that familiar mold of romantic, introspective, acoustic folk-pop". He felt that the album "focuses on gently picked lovelorn pleas and somewhat uninspired romantic phrasing" and commented that it "seems a bit too middle of the road to really distinguish him from the crowded pack of similar young bards." Clash writer Jack Scourfield praised the album's "heartfelt honesty" that can "spread the youthful nostalgia adeptly across any generational gaps." He also noted that the album "does become prone to dragging during some of its less well-defined, slower numbers." Jaymz Clements for Rolling Stone Australia gave Dream Your Life Away a positive review, stating that the album effectively "[shows] there's more to Vance Joy than "Riptide"", noting that the album is "confident, self-assured and classically Australian, with an appeal that's universal."

Commercial performance 
On 13 September 2014 the album entered the Australian Albums Chart at number one. It is the eleventh album to reach number one for an Australian act in 2014 and the first time ever that the Liberation label have landed back-to-back number ones after Jimmy Barnes's album 30:30 Hindsight reached number one the previous week. In the United States, the album peaked at number 17 on the US Billboard 200 chart and number two on the Top Alternative Albums chart. The album was eventually certified Platinum by the Recording Industry Association of America (RIAA) for combined sales and album-equivalent units of over a million units in the United States.

Track listing 
All tracks are written by Vance Joy.

Personnel 
 Jono Colliver – bass guitar, background vocals
 Ryan Hadlock – acoustic guitar, electric guitar, keyboards, percussion, synthesizer
 Lauren Jacobson – viola, violin
 James Keogh – acoustic guitar, electric guitar, piano, synthesizer bass, ukulele, lead vocals, background vocals
 Kimo Muraki – saxophone, background vocals
 Jerry Streeter – background vocals
 Adam Trachsel – bass guitar, upright bass
 Edwin White – brass arrangements, cello, drums, electric guitar, keyboards, percussion, string arrangements, synthesizer, synthesizer programming, background vocals

Charts

Weekly charts

Year-end charts

Decade-end charts

Certifications

Release history

References 

2014 debut albums
ARIA Award-winning albums
Vance Joy albums
Albums recorded at Bear Creek Studio